Crystal Crown may refer to:
 Shenyang Olympic Sports Center Stadium
 Silver Jubilee Crystal Crown